Camouflage is a 1944 American animated short film. It was produced by the First Motion Picture Unit, and was intended to train the United States Military in the use of camouflage against air-raids.

In the short, a chameleon called "Now You See Him Now You Don't, Yehudi" explains the basics of camouflage to a group of airmen following an air raid by Japanese planes.

See also
Military camouflage
Training film

External links

 

1944 films
1940s animated short films
American World War II propaganda shorts
First Motion Picture Unit films
1940s American animated films
American animated short films
1944 animated films
Articles containing video clips
American black-and-white films
1940s English-language films